The following low-power television stations broadcast on digital or analog channel 8 in the United States:

 K08AK-D in Port Orford, etc., Oregon
 K08AP-D in Pateros/Mansfield, Washington
 K08AY-D in Winthrop-Twisp, Washington
 K08BO-D in Virgin, Utah
 K08CB-D in Lund & Preston, Nevada
 K08CW-D in Malott/Wakefield, Washington
 K08CX-D in Tonasket, Washington
 K08CY-D in Riverside, Washington
 K08EN-D in Pine Valley, etc., Utah
 K08ET-D in Durango, Colorado
 K08EZ-D in Mink Creek, Idaho
 K08FS-D in Dodson, Montana
 K08HN-D in Aspen, Colorado
 K08HU-D in Aleknagik, Alaska
 K08IO-D in Wells, Nevada
 K08IP-D in Baker, Montana
 K08JP-D in Dryden, Washington
 K08JV-D in Broadus, Montana
 K08KA-D in Girdwood, Alaska
 K08KD-D in Alakanuk, Alaska
 K08KO-D in Cooper Landing, Alaska
 K08KT-D in Boulder, Montana
 K08KW-D in Richland, Oregon
 K08LG-D in Silver Lake, etc., Oregon
 K08LI-D in White Sulphur Springs, Montana
 K08LL-D in Dolores, Colorado
 K08LN-D in Harrison, Nebraska
 K08LS-D in Elko, Nevada
 K08MB-D in Weber Canyon, Colorado
 K08ND-D in Akron, Colorado
 K08NQ-D in Ryndon, Nevada
 K08OB-D in Newell, California
 K08OU-D in Seattle, Washington
 K08OV-D in Nenana, Alaska
 K08OW-D in Hysham, Montana
 K08OX-D in Thomasville, Colorado
 K08OY-D in Plains, Montana
 K08OZ-D in Trout Creek, etc., Montana
 K08PC-D in Hildale, etc., Utah
 K08PE-D in Alamo, etc., Nevada
 K08PF-D in Leamington, Utah
 K08PG-D in Indian Springs, Nevada
 K08PI-D in Salmon, Montana
 K08PJ-D in Cedar City, Utah
 K08PK-D in Bullhead City, Arizona
 K08PM-D in Wagner, South Dakota
 K08PN-D in Homer, etc., Alaska
 K08PP-D in Rosebud, etc., Montana
 K08PQ-D in Big Arm/Elmo, Montana
 K08PR-D in Missoula, Montana
 K08PT-D in Bakersfield, California
 K08PW-D in Laketown, etc., Utah
 K08PZ-D in Corvallis, Oregon
 K08QA-D in Aurora, etc., Utah
 K08QB-D in Crouch/Garden Valley, Idaho
 K08QC-D in Sigurd & Salina, Utah
 K08QD-D in Woodland & Kamas, Utah
 K08QE-D in Fergus Falls, Minnesota
 K08QF-D in East Price, Utah
 K08QG-D in Helper, Utah
 K08QH-D in Roosevelt, etc., Utah
 K08QJ-D in Rio Grande City, Texas
 K08QL-D in Logan, Utah
 K08QM-D in Wendover, Utah
 K08QN-D in Golden Valley, Arizona
 K32HR-D in Long Valley Junction, Utah
 K46AF-D in Blanding/Monticello, Utah
 KEET in Hoopa, California
 KFLA-LD in Los Angeles, California
 KILA-LD in Cherry Valley, California
 KKDJ-LD in Santa Maria, California
 KPSW-LD in Boise, Idaho
 KUCB-LD in Dutch Harbor, Alaska
 KVFR-LD in Redding, California
 KVPS-LD in Indio, California
 KWCZ-LD in Sunnyside-Grandview, Washington
 KWVC-LD in Malaga, etc., Washington
 KXMP-LD in Harrison, Arkansas
 KZDF-LD in Santa Barbara, California
 W08AT-D in Cherokee, North Carolina
 W08BF-D in Spruce Pine, North Carolina
 W08ED-D in Marathon, Florida
 W08EH-D in Ponce, Puerto Rico
 W08EI-D in Guaynabo, Puerto Rico
 W08EJ-D in Anasco, Puerto Rico
 WGCT-CD in Columbus, Ohio
 WGEN-LD in Miami, Florida
 WGSC-CD in Murrells Inlet, South Carolina
 WGSI-CD in Murrells Inlet, South Carolina, uses WGSC-CD's spectrum
 WIGL-LD in Athens, Georgia
 WIIH-CD in Indianapolis, Indiana
 WOFT-LD in Ocala, Florida
 WRBD-LP in Pensacola, Florida
 WUDT-LD in Detroit, Michigan
 WVFW-LD in Miami, Florida
 WVMY-LD in Parkersburg, West Virginia
 WWVW-LD in Wheeling, West Virginia
 WXOD-LD in Palm Beach, Florida

The following low-power stations, which are no longer licensed, formerly broadcast on digital or analog channel 8:
 K08AA in Wyodak, etc., Wyoming
 K08AS in Henefer, etc., Utah
 K08AU in Spring Glen, etc., Utah
 K08AX-D in Ardenvoir, Washington
 K08BA-D in Orondo, etc., Washington
 K08BG-D in Troy, Montana
 K08CE in Kanarraville, Utah
 K08CF in Scofield, Utah
 K08CL in Koosharem, Utah
 K08CS in Roosevelt, etc., Utah
 K08CT in Duchesne, Utah
 K08EE in Potter Valley, California
 K08EQ in Seiad Valley, California
 K08ES in Red River, New Mexico
 K08FR in Aztec, New Mexico
 K08GA in Morgan, etc., Utah
 K08HJ in Orleans, California
 K08IA in Newberry Springs, California
 K08ID-D in Tuluksak, Alaska
 K08IE in Peoa/Oakley, Utah
 K08JD in Fruitland, Utah
 K08JE in Wanship, Utah
 K08JR in Laketown, etc., Utah
 K08JZ-D in Waunita Hot Springs, Colorado
 K08KM in Sheep Mountain, Alaska
 K08KP in Hollis, Alaska
 K08KS in King Salmon, Alaska
 K08LD in Miranda, California
 K08LW-D in Kenai/Soldotna, Alaska
 K08MC in Leamington, Utah
 K08NM in Orovada, Nevada
 K08NP-D in John Day, Oregon
 K08OR-D in Canby, California
 KOOT-LP in Silver City, New Mexico
 KTMV-LP in Corpus Christi, Texas
 W08AB in Guayama, Puerto Rico
 W08AN in Bryson City, etc., North Carolina
 W08BH in Andrews, etc., North Carolina
 W08DP in Springfield, Illinois
 WRAV-LP in Ocean City, Maryland

References

08 low-power